Egmanton is a small village and civil parish in Nottinghamshire, England, and is located one mile south of Tuxford and one mile north of Laxton. The population of the civil parish taken at the 2011 Census was 286. The name derives from the Old English words for Ecgmund's farm/settlement.

The nearest larger towns are Retford and Newark-on-Trent. It is located approximately 35 metres above sea level.

It is part of the Caunton Ward of the administrative district of Newark and Sherwood District Council and the county of Nottinghamshire. It lies within the Parliamentary constituency of Newark.

Egmanton was mentioned in the Domesday Survey of 1086.

According to the 2001 census it has 254 inhabitants in 101 households . The amenities include an Anglican church, a village hall (formerly the old school) and a pub, 'The Old Plough'.

The main economic activity in the village is farming.

Historical sites

Egmanton Church – 'Our Lady of Egmanton Church' 

Egmanton church is best known for the Shrine of Our Lady of Egmanton contained within the church itself. A pilgrimage takes place to commemorate the shrine.  

More information on Egmanton Church

Egmanton Castle 

Egmanton Castle consists of the remains of a Motte and Bailey style castle. It is commonly known as Gaddick Hill.

Medieval fish ponds 

To the west of the village off Kirton road are some earthworks which are the remains of medieval fish ponds, now dry. The following links provide more information on the importance of fish ponds to people in the Middle Ages.

Windmill

A tower windmill was located at the southern end of Mill Lane.

Oil fields 

Oil has been produced from the East Midlands oil fields since 1939 with some production wells located around Egmanton. Although many have now closed, some of these wells remain in production to this day. On a national scale the level of production was never significant.

References

External links 

The official website for the village
The Egmanton Village Hall website
Map of Egmanton courtesy of multimap.com.
More information on the East Midlands oil fields
More information on the Caunton Ward from the UK Office for National Statistics

Shrines to the Virgin Mary
Newark and Sherwood
Villages in Nottinghamshire